Kenneth Marin (14 October 1922 – 1 September 2007) was an American professor of economics who worked under President Lyndon B. Johnson.  President Johnson appointed Marin as a member of the White House Consumer Advisory Council where he served on Wage and Price Control during the mid-sixties.1

He was a graduate of Aquinas College and the University of Michigan, Ann Arbor.

In 1966, Professor Marin was a member of a U.S. State Department evaluation team that was assigned to review various performances in the economic and political arena in six South American countries.2

In 1968, Kenneth Marin went to Tanzania where he worked as an economist for the government of Tanzania in Dar es Salaam. He served as an adviser to the government on capital mobilisation and utilisation until the early seventies. After he returned to the United States he went to teach economics at his alma mater, Aquinas College in his hometown of Grand Rapids, Michigan. He started teaching  economics at Aquinas College in 1953 and was the chairman of the economics department for many years.He retired in 1989.3

One of his students at Aquinas College in 1976 was Godfrey Mwakikagile from Tanzania who became  a prominent Africanist scholar and renowned author of books in African studies specialising in economics, politics, history and other subjects about Africa. In his book African Political Thought, Professor Guy Martin has described Godfrey Mwakikagile as one of Africa's leading populist scholars and thinkers.

Professor Edmond J. Keller, chairman of the political science department, director of the UCLA Globalization Research Center-Africa and former director of the James S. Coleman African Studies Center at the University of California-Los Angeles, described Godfrey Mwakikagile as a public intellectual and an academic theorist in his review of African Political Thought in one of the leading academic journals on African research and studies, Africa Today, Volume 60, Number 2, Winter 2013, published by Indiana University Press:

"The work is an ambitious survey. Martin is encyclopedic in his treatment of the subject of African political thinking. He demonstrates a comprehensive knowledge of African political thought throughout history. He has succeeded in his efforts to produce what is arguably the first real attempt to synthesize African political thought into a single thematic volume....

Martin begins his analysis by focusing on indigenous political thought dating back to ancient times (Kush/Nubia, sixth  century BCE). He then brings his study up to the present...He systematically introduces the reader to the ideas of specific theorists and their biographies. He situates these thinkers in the context of their times. Some were political activists, such as Amílcar Cabral, Samora Machel, Kwame Nkrumah, Julius Nyerere, and Steve Biko. Others were public intellectuals and academic theorists, such as Claude Ake, Godfrey Mwakikagile, Daniel Tetteh Osabu-Kle, and Mueni wa Muiu.

For the amount of ground covered in African Political Thought, this is quite a slim volume. The comprehensiveness of the book is its greatest strength. It touches upon most of the major African political thinkers....It is interesting that the political thought of Meles Zenawi, the now-deceased political leader of Ethiopia, is not considered. Debate is currently raging as to whether or not, despite his views on Marxism, he was an original thinker."

Godfrey Mwakikagile is also featured as a major African author and scholar in the Dictionary of African Biography, Volume 6 (Oxford University Press, 2011), edited by Harvard University professors, Emmanuel K. Akyeampong and Henry Louis Gates, Jr. Professor Ryan Ronnenberg who has written about Godfrey Mwakikagile in the Dictionary of African Biography (pp. 365–366) states:

"His experience...inspired his thinking regarding Africa and its relationship to the Western world, which led to several academic works dedicated to the subject.

Mwakikagile's early works focused on pressing issues in African studies, particularly the theory and realization of development in Africa. Economic Development in Africa, published in 1999, uses the rich case study of Tanzania's transition from socialism to free-market capitalism as a foundation for broader conclusions concerning the continent's development failures. 

Mwakikagile writes about Africa as a whole in such a way as to suggest that he possesses not only a keen understanding of the way things are, but also a deep understanding of the way they should be. The arcebically titled Africa Is in a Mess: What Went Wrong and What Should Be Done reflects on the decades since independence with pragmatism and regret, observing the loss of both leadership and ingenuity as the continent's intellectual elite settle abroad, while suggesting how this process might be reversed.

In fact, as the years have passed, and as those early optimistic moments after independence have slipped away, Mwakikagile has taken it upon himself to write about why Africa has fallen short of its vision.
Mwakikagile has translated his experience as a youth in colonial East Africa and his adulthood in postcolonial Tanzania into provocative scholarship concerning topics vitally important to African studies."

The premier of Western Cape province in South Africa, Helen Zille of the Democratic Alliance (DA), the main opposition party in the country, also mentioned Godfrey Mwakikagile in her speech in parliament on 28 March 2017 in defence of what she wrote about colonialism in her Tweets, stating that he was one of the prominent intellectuals who articulated the same position she did on the impact of colonialism on the colonised. Others she mentioned were Professor Ali Mazrui, an internationally renowned scholar from Kenya, and Nigerian award-winning author Chinua Achebe. She also quoted Nelson Mandela and former prime minister of India, Manmohan Singh, saying they expressed similar sentiments these leading intellectuals and herself did on the impact of colonialism on Africa and elsewhere.

South African Vice-President Phumzile Mlambo-Ngcuka also quoted Godfrey Mwakikagile from his book, Nyerere and Africa: End of an Era, in one of her speeches about African leadership and development at a meeting of African leaders and diplomats at the University of Western Cape, South Africa, in September 2006. The book is a seminal work which has been cited by other African leaders and is one of Mwakikagile's most influential works.

Another economics student of Kenneth Marin at Aquinas College was Enos Bukuku, also from Tanzania, in the sixties. Bukuku went on to become a senior lecturer in economics at the University of Dar es Salaam, a deputy governor of the Tanzania Central Bank, an economic adviser to President Julius Nyerere, and deputy secretary-general of the East African Community (EAC) among other posts. He was also a member of the Tanzanian delegation that went to the People's Republic of China to negotiate with the Chinese government for financial assistance to build the Tanzania-Zambia Railway also known as TAZARA.

Kenneth Marin died on September 1, 2007, in Chelsea, Michigan. He was 85. According to his obituary:

"His education was interrupted when he served in WWII as an Air Force weather observer in Italy, from 1943 to 1945. He returned to Aquinas to complete his degree in Economics in 1947, and continued on to the University of Michigan (U of M) to complete an M.A. in Economics in 1948. He also pursued a doctoral program in Economics at U of M from 1949 to 1952. In 1953, he returned and joined the Aquinas faculty as Asst. Professor of Economics and Public Relations Director where he stayed until his retirement in 1989....

In 1966, he was part of State Department Evaluation Team to review operations in six South American countries. In 1968, on an academic leave of absence and sabbatical, he moved his family to East Africa, where he served as an advisor on capitol mobilization and utilization to the United Republic of Tanzania; and was appointed by President Lyndon B. Johnson to his Consumer Advisory Council."4

References

1. Godfrey Mwakikagile, Nyerere and Africa: End of an Era, New Africa Press, Fifth Edition, Pretoria, South Africa, 2010, pp. 653, 668, 669.

2. "Former CUNA (Credit Union National Association) chairman Ken Marin dies," Credit Union Times, Hoboken, New Jersey, January 8, 2008; Credit Union Times, December 4, 2012.

3. G. Mwakikagile,Nyerere and Africa: End of an Era, ibid.; "Former CUNA (Credit Union National Association) chairman Ken Marin dies," Credit Union Times, Hoboken, New Jersey, January 8, 2008: "In 1968, he moved with his family to East Africa where he served as an advisor to the United Republic of Tanzania on capital mobilization and utilization. Marin also was appointed by President Lyndon B. Johnson as a member of the White House Consumer Advisory Council."

4. Kenneth Marin, Obituary, www.lifestorynet.com, Chelsea, Michigan, September 1, 2007.

5. https://sites.google.com/site/intercontinentalbookcentre/godfrey-mwakikagile-a-eurocentric-pan-africanist

1922 births
2007 deaths
Aquinas College (Michigan) alumni
People from Grand Rapids, Michigan
Lyndon B. Johnson administration personnel
University of Michigan alumni